Cap-d'Ail (or Capo d'Aglio) is a seaside commune in the Alpes-Maritimes department in the Provence-Alpes-Côte d'Azur region in Southeastern France. In 2019, it had a population of 4,523.

Geography
Cap-d'Ail borders the areas of La Colle, Les Révoires and Fontvieille in the Principality of Monaco.

Contemporary Cap-d'Ail is a modern seaside resort with a lively shopping district on the Basse Corniche and quiet, fashionable residential areas. Many people who work in Monaco live there. Plage Mala is prized by many day trippers from Monaco and Nice.

Cap-d'Ail is served by a 1881 station on the Marseille–Ventimiglia railway, the last before the Monégasque border.

History 
On 13 September 1982, Princess Grace de Monaco was killed in a car accident.

Demographics

See also
Communes of the Alpes-Maritimes department

References

Communes of Alpes-Maritimes
Alpes-Maritimes communes articles needing translation from French Wikipedia